Chochoveni Nunatak (‘Nunatak Chochoveni’ \'nu-na-tak cho-cho-'ve-ni\) is a rocky hill rising to  in the southwest part of Cugnot Ice Piedmont on Trinity Peninsula in Graham Land, Antarctica.

The nunatak is named after the settlements of Golyamo (Great) Chochoveni and Malko (Little) Chochoveni in Southeastern Bulgaria.

Location
German-British mapping in 1996.

Maps
Trinity Peninsula. Scale 1:250000 topographic map No. 5697. Institut für Angewandte Geodäsie and British Antarctic Survey, 1996.
Antarctic Digital Database (ADD). Scale 1:250000 topographic map of Antarctica. Scientific Committee on Antarctic Research (SCAR), 1993–2016.

Notes

References
Chochoveni Nunatak. SCAR Composite Antarctic Gazetteer
 Bulgarian Antarctic Gazetteer. Antarctic Place-names Commission. (details in Bulgarian, basic data in English)

External links
 Chochoveni Nunatak. Copernix satellite image

Nunataks of Trinity Peninsula
Bulgaria and the Antarctic